Mireille is a female given name.

Mireille may also refer to:

Mireille (opera), by Charles Gounod
594 Mireille, an asteroid
Typhoon Mireille, one of the deadliest typhoons of the 1991 Pacific season